Riverview is an unincorporated census-designated place in Hillsborough County, Florida, United States. It is located south of Brandon. The population was 107,396 in the 2020 census, up from 71,050 in the 2010 census.

Many of Tampa Bay's radio and television stations broadcast from an antenna farm in the Riverview area, on Boyette Road, southeast of town. Riverview is home to Bell Creek Nature Preserve.

History 
Riverview was founded in 1885 on the Alafia River's north shore. However, in the 1830s settlers arrived on the south side of the river at an area formerly known as Peru (pronounced "Pe-Roo") because Peru was an indigenous name for "straight part of the river". Peru existed for nearly 100 years and was one of the oldest settlements in central Florida. It wasn't until the 1940s that Riverview absorbed Peru, and now claims the south side of the Alafia River. The Peruvian Mining Company, which mined phosphate from the Alafia, took its name from the settlement. The term "Alafia" is translated as "River of Fire" due to the phosphorus on the early riverbottom glowing at night.

The area's first school was built in 1893, inside the Peru Baptist Church. The area called Riverview began to be populated on the north side of the river. The two communities were connected by a river ferry. Soon after, a bridge was constructed from sections of a bridge that once spanned the Hillsborough River in downtown Tampa. The post office periodically was moved from the Riverview side to the Peru side of the river and back, causing much tension. The Riverview name eventually came into usage in the early 1940s by the post office to relieve just such confusion with the mail.  Peru has disappeared from all but the earliest maps. Some of Peru's or Riverview's settlers include the Barnes, Bourgees, Boyettes, Brandons, Buzbees, Hackneys, Hancocks, Hartleys, Mansfields, Moodys, Simmons, Scotts, Symmes, Topes, Thompsons, Whitts, and the Yeomans. The area founded by the Boyette family is now the community of Boyette, located in the eastern part of the Riverview CDP.

The first commercial poultry farm in Florida was established by Emmet and Myrtle Tope in Riverview in 1921.

Geography
Riverview is located southeast of the center of Hillsborough County. The Alafia River flows through the northern part of the CDP and forms part of its northeastern border, separating Riverview from Bloomingdale to the northeast. Other neighboring communities, all unincorporated, are Brandon to the north, Palm River-Clair Mel to the northwest, Progress Village and Gibsonton to the west, Apollo Beach to the southwest, Balm to the south, and FishHawk to the east.

Interstate 75 forms the western edge of the Riverview CDP, with access from Exits 246, 250, 254, and 256. U.S. Route 301 runs through the western side of the CDP, parallel to I-75 and through the original settlement of Riverview at the Alafia River.

Demographics

As of 2010, there were 27,513 housing units, out of which 11.0% were vacant. Out of the 24,488 occupied households in the community, 45.2% had children under the age of 18 living with them, 57.0% were headed by married couples living together, 14.3% had a female householder with no husband present, and 23.5% were non-families. 17.4% of all households were made up of individuals, and 4.4% were someone living alone who was 65 years of age or older. The average household size was 2.89 and the average family size was 3.27.

Within the CDP, 29.1% of the population were under the age of 18, 7.6% were from 18 to 24, 31.9% were from 25 to 44, 23.8% were from 45 to 64, and 7.7% were 65 years of age or older. The median age was 34.1 years. For every 100 females, there were 92.6 males. For every 100 females age 18 and over, there were 88.7 males.

For the period 2011-15, the estimated median annual income for a household in the community was $66,497, and the median income for a family was $71,517. Male full-time workers had a median income of $47,554 versus $38,000 for females. The per capita income for the community was $26,126. 9.5% of the population and 7.2% of families were below the poverty line. 11.7% of people under 18 and 7.9% of people 65 or older were living in poverty.

Languages
According to the American Community Survey (ACS), the following estimates were given for the period 2011-15, English spoken at home accounted for 76.64% of all residents, while 23.36% spoke some other language at home. Spanish speakers (of whom 75.5% spoke English "very well") made up 16.98% of the population. No other language accounted for more than 1% of the population.

Education
Riverview is served by the Hillsborough County Public School District with 15 K-12 public schools.

Elementary
Frost
Ippolito
Symmes
Riverview
Boyette Springs
Sessums
Collins
Summerfield
Summerfield Crossings
Dawson
Middle
Giunta
Rodgers
High
Riverview High School
Spoto High School
Sumner High School
Grade school students in Riverview are also served by schools in nearby Lithia and Gibsonton. There are also many charter and private school options in Riverview. 

Riverview has two colleges: Western Michigan University Cooley Law School near Falkenburg Rd and HCC at The Regent, a satellite campus of Hillsborough Community College in Winthrop Village.

Notable people
Jahleel Addae, NFL safety
Debra LaFave, a middle school teacher convicted of having sex with a student
Dioner Navarro, an MLB catcher
Tom Daugherty, a PBA bowler
Ronnie Oneal, murderer

References

External links
 Greater Riverview Chamber of Commerce

Census-designated places in Hillsborough County, Florida
Census-designated places in Florida
1885 establishments in Florida
Populated places established in 1885